Robert Stock (born October 15, 1944), also known as Bob Stock, is an American former professional tennis player.

Raised in Iowa, Stock played collegiate tennis for the UCLA Bruins, where he was a teammate of Arthur Ashe. While in college he was drafted into the Marines and served an 11-month tour of Vietnam in 1969. He competed on the professional tour in the early 1970s and qualified twice for the main draw at the Wimbledon Championships.

References

External links
 
 

1944 births
Living people
American male tennis players
UCLA Bruins men's tennis players
Tennis people from Iowa
United States Marine Corps personnel of the Vietnam War